Hadaka may refer to:

Hadaka Matsuri, type of Japanese festival in which participants wear a minimum amount of clothing
Hadaka no Kokoro, album recorded by female Japanese pop artist Watanabe Misato
Hadaka no Rallizes, reclusive Japanese psychedelic noise band
Hadaka no Shōnen, TV Asahi cooking program
Hadaka no taiyo, 1958 Japanese film directed by Miyoji Ieki